Mandi in Himachal Pradesh is popularly known as "Choti Kashi" due to its resemblance with Kashi. The famous Victoria Bridge of here links Purani Mandi and Mandi town. The majestic ruler of Mandi, Raja Vijay Singh built this mesmerizing bridge with the help of Britishers in 1877. The Bridge reminds the hanging Victoria Bridge on Thames River. It is like stylistic Jhulla bridges but surprisingly it can carry small vehicles. However, as this is a value bridge to Government of Himachal Pradesh, CM Jai Ram Thakur in 2019 built and inaugurated another bridge named Sardar Patel Bridge (or New Victoria Bridge) near Victoria Bridge and it was opened for transport. Victoria Bridge was closed for all means of transport after its 142 years of service.

In 2020, a majestic thanksgiving ceremony was organized by Himachal Pradesh Government's Mandi branch, Mandi council and National Culture Fund. The Bridge was decorated with flowers and carpets and a worshipping "yagna" ceremony was offered. This gentle gesture was done to show respect to the Majestic bridge which suffered so much onslaughts of river flood but stood tall and gave service for 142 years. The bridge would be maintained and rigorously repaired, assured Ministry, as it is cynosure of Tourism Industry.

References

Buildings and structures in Mandi district
Bridges in Himachal Pradesh
British-era buildings in Himachal Pradesh